This is an expanding list of Israeli libraries. The list is based on the information provided by The National Library of Israel and a list of 680 public libraries provided by the Israeli Ministry of Culture and Sports

National libraries 

 National Library of Israel

Public libraries 
Even-Yehuda public library 
Be'er Ya'akov public library
Belfer Library, Ramla
Gezer Regional Library
Kotar Rishon, Rishon-Lezion
Kfar Yona public library
Mitzpe Yericho public library
Raanana public library
Ramat-Gan public library
HaKramim Library, Modiin
Kotar Reut Library, Reut
The Moshe Shechter Public Library, Modiin
The Sha'ar Zion - Beit Ariela Library, Tel Aviv
The Felicia Blumental Music Center & Library, Tel Aviv
Netanya public libraries
Zikhron Ya'akov public library
 Ganey Tikva public library
Beit Aryeh-Ofarim public library
Ramat HaSharon public library
Rachel & Naftali Becker public library, Kiryat Ekron  
Azor public library
The Chais Library, Mevaseret Zion
Efrat Library
Herzliya public library

School libraries 

 Dror Educational Campus school library
Ulpenat Orot Modiin Library
 Leyada School Library
 Tichon Hadash Herzliya Library

Academic libraries 

Academic Arab College for Education, Haifa
Achva Academic College Library
Afeka College of Engineering Library
Al-Qasemi Academic College of Education Library
Ariel University Library
Ashkelon Academic College Library
Bar-Ilan Libraries and Information System [Bar-Ilan University]
Berman Medical Library
Bernard G. Segal Law Library, The Hebrew University of Jerusalem
Conard Schick Library
Eilat Campus Library, Ben-Gurion University of the Negev
Elyachar Central Library
Hadassah Academic College Library
 Kinneret Academic College Library 
The Neiman Library of Exact Sciences and Engineering, Tel Aviv University 
ORT Braude Academic College of Engineering Library 
Ruppin Academic Center Library 
Rothberg International School Library, The Hebrew University of Jerusalem
Sourasky Central Library, Tel Aviv University
Wiener Library for the Study of the Nazi Era and the Holocaust
Wurzweiler Central Library, Bar Ilan University
Younes and Soraya Nazarian Library, University of Haifa

Special libraries 

 Agricultural Research Organization (ARO), Volcani Center
Bnai Zion Medical Center, medical library
 The Art Library in Memory of Meir Arison, Donated by the Ted Arison Family Foundation, Tel Aviv Museum of Art

See also 

 List of archives in Israel
 List of Israeli museums

References 

Israel
 
Libraries
Libraries